François Capois  (or François Cappoix; 1766 – October 8, 1806, nicknamed Capois-La-Mort, also Cappoix-la-Mort, meaning "Capois-Death") was a Haitian officer in the Haitian Revolution (1791–1794) for independence from France.

He was born in Port-de-Paix, Saint-Domingue on the island of Hispaniola, on the plantation of Laveaux/Lapointe. His name was a transformation of the name cappouet, owner of the plantation.

Military career
His military career began in 1793 after a visit with independence leader Toussaint Louverture at Port-de-Paix. Then under the colonel Jacques Maurepas he was a member of the 9th brigade. His rank in the army changed quickly, first to Lieutenant, then to Captain of the 3rd Battalion. He participated under general Jacques Maurepas against all expeditions and invasions in the north-eastern region of the island. Capois is mostly known for his extraordinary courage and especially his herculean bravery at the Battle of Vertières in which the French general Viscount of Rochambeau, commander of Napoleon's army in Saint-Domingue (colonial Haiti), even called a brief cease-fire to congratulate him.

Capturing of Port-de-Paix and Tortuga Island
After receiving new troops from France, Rochambeau dispatched General Clauzel against Port-de-Paix which Capois was forced to evacuate, but the fearless black general redeemed his defeat by storming the Petit-Fort where he captured the ammunition, of which he was in great need. After his success at Petit-Fort, he decided to attack Tortuga island (Île de la Tortue). The most difficult problem he had in this attack was how to reach this island without ships. He made up for this lack by building a raft consisting merely of planks held together by lianas.

On the night of February 18, 1803, 150 soldiers under the command of Vincent Louis were huddled together on this frail means of transportation in tow of 2 rowboats. They fell unexpectedly on the garrison of Tortuga and, for a while, seemed to be the conquerors. But the French, who soon got over their surprise, rallied and defeated Vincent Louis, who succeeded in making his escape with some of his companions. The unfortunate blacks who were taken prisoner by the French were tortured to death in expiation of the audacious attempt.

The failure did not discourage the energy of Capois. On April 12, 1803, Capois stormed  Port-de-Paix, and soon after, Vincent Louis on his raft was again on his way to Tortuga. He succeeded this time in taking possession of the island, which the French never recovered.

Battle of Vertières

On November 18, 1803, Jean-Jacques Dessalines had ordered Capois to take Vertières, a fort situated upon a mount. Capois-la-Mort advanced with a demi-brigade which, horribly mutilated, soon recoiled before the cannon fire coming from the fort. He led it back for a second time, but was again driven to the bottom of the hill by the mitrailleuse.

Boiling with rage, Capois ran to seek other new troops and, mounting his horse, advanced for the third time; again the thousand deaths that vomited from the fortress repulsed him and his brigade. Now for the fourth time, he asked his  men to follow him by saying "Forward! forward!". While he was at the head of his men, his horse was hit by a cannonball—he fell, but Capois took his sword, got up, and ran to place himself again at the head of his black soldiers by shouting "Forward! Forward!" His cap, garnished with plumes, was carried away by a shot. He replied to the insult which left him hatless by drawing his sword and again throwing himself into the assault.

Observing this, Rochambeau and his men shouted: "Bravo! bravo! bravo!" The firing in the fort ceased. Suddenly, the battle was still. A French staff officer mounted his horse and rode toward the intrepid Capois-la-Mort. With a great voice he shouted: "General Rochambeau sends compliments to the general who has just covered himself with such glory!" Then he saluted the Haitian warriors, returned to his position and the fight resumed.

The next morning, a French officer followed by his companions led to the headquarters of the Haitian army a horse caparisoned, and delivered him with these words: "The Captain-general (Rochambeau) offers this horse as a mark of admiration to the "black Achilles" to replace the one of his that the French army regrets having killed."

Death
On October 8, 1806, Capois was on his way to Cap-Haïtien when, near Limonade, he rode into a trap set for him, and was killed by assassins on the orders of Henri Christophe.

See also
Jacques Maurepas
Toussaint Louverture
Battle of Vertières
History of Haiti

References

External links
 Francois Capois  The Louverture-project.
 Francois Capois and the battle of Vertiere By William Leslie Balan-Gaubert

1766 births
1806 deaths
Haitian rebel slaves
Military leaders of the French Revolutionary Wars
People from Nord (Haitian department)
Haitian independence activists